The brown-headed thrush (Turdus chrysolaus), sometimes known as the brown thrush, is a species of bird in the family Turdidae. It breeds in Sakhalin, the Kuril Islands and Japan; it winters in south toward the Ryukyu Islands, Taiwan, Hainan and the northern Philippines. Its natural habitat is temperate forests.

References

External links 
 

brown-headed thrush
Birds of Japan
brown-headed thrush
Taxonomy articles created by Polbot